Major General Timothy James Grant,  is a retired senior officer of the Canadian Army.

Education
Grant attended the University of Guelph, graduating in 1977 with a Bachelor of Science. Upon graduation he enrolled in the Canadian Forces through the Direct Entry Officer programme, becoming an armour officer. Grant is a graduate of the All-arms Tactics Course (UK), Command and Staff College, the Advanced Military Studies Course and the National Security Studies Course.

Career
During Grant's career he has filled many staff positions, such as Chief of Staff, Land Force Western Area and participated in two tours at National Defence Headquarters with the Joint Operations Directorate. Grant was actively involved in planning Canada's contribution to the "Campaign Against Terrorism" which included the first deployment of the Canadian Forces in Afghanistan.

Grant has been in command of numerous Canadian Forces units throughout his career, ranging from a single troop to the brigade level in both Canada and in Germany (with NATO). He served as an exchange officer at the Royal Australian Armour Centre. As commanding officer of Lord Strathcona's Horse (Royal Canadians) he was deployed with his battle group to Bosnia in 1997 with NATO's SFOR. Later, he returned to Bosnia to command the Canadian Forces contingent. Grant was in command of the 1 Canadian Mechanized Brigade Group from 2003 until 2005, which included a deployment to Kabul as part of the International Security Assistance Force and the first Canadian-led Provincial Reconstruction Team to Kandahar.

From November 2006 until August 2007, holding the rank of brigadier general, Grant was in command of all Canadian Forces in Afghanistan. Grant was promoted to major general after he finished his tour in Afghanistan and took the position of Deputy Commander Canadian Expeditionary Force Command in October 2007. He retired as a in August 2008.

References

Senior Officer Biography: Major-General T.J. Grant, OMM, CD

Canadian generals
Canadian military personnel of the War in Afghanistan (2001–2021)
Living people
Officers of the Order of Military Merit (Canada)
Recipients of the Meritorious Service Decoration
University of Guelph alumni
Year of birth missing (living people)
Lord Strathcona's Horse officers